Barry Sehlin (born December 27, 1942) is an American politician who served in the Washington House of Representatives from the 10th district from 1993 to 1999 and from 2001 to 2005.

References

1942 births
Living people
Republican Party members of the Washington House of Representatives